Abbas Nouvinrozegar is a retired Iranian midfielder who played for Iran national football team. He was formerly playing for Taj Tehran.

References

External links
 
 Abbas Nouvinrozegar at TeamMelli.com

Living people
Iranian footballers
Esteghlal F.C. players
Association football midfielders
Year of birth missing (living people)
Iran international footballers